Jack Lake may refer to:

People
Jack Lake (footballer), an Australian rules footballer

Places
Jack Lake, Simcoe County, Ontario, community in the municipality of Clearview, Ontario
Jack Lake (Halifax), lake in Halifax, Nova Scotia
Jack Lake (Nipissing District), lake in Nipissing District, Ontario, within Algonquin Provincial Park
Jack Lake (Peterborough County), lake in the Kawartha Lakes in Peterborough County, Ontario
Jack Lake, Peterborough County, dispersed rural community, on the northwest shore of Jack Lake (Peterborough County), in Peterborough County, Ontario